The Pamenar Mosque, Kerman, Iran dates from the Muzaffarids and is located in Kerman.

Sources 

Mosques in Iran
Buildings and structures in Kerman Province
National works of Iran
Kerman